Forge of Freedom: The American Civil War is a computer wargame, combining both a strategic level and a tactical level by means of letting the player(s) raise, equip and move armies and then fight out battles on a randomized map when encountering the enemy. This game was made by Western Civilization Software, whose headquarters is located just outside Ann Arbor, Michigan, and uses the same game engine as the company's 2005 release, "Crown of Glory: Europe in the Age of Napoleon" and 2009 expansion "Crown of Glory: Emperor's Edition," which likewise features a combination of grand strategy and tactics.

Basic Facts
There are two playable factions available in this game, the Confederacy and the Union (although foreign intervention is a possibility). The campaign map for the strategic level stretches from Minnesota to Texas and from Maine to Florida. Battle maps for the tactical level are made of terrain hexes which correspond to how far a unit can move. Battles are fought at the brigade-level, and the player gets to customize his brigades by purchasing weapons and "brigade attributes" (e.g., brigade cavalry, scouts, sharpshooters, Zouaves). There are more than 1000 Civil War generals in the game, with the most famous (and infamous) having a 100% chance to appear each game, while the less famous ones have a much smaller chance of entering the game. As part of an ongoing project, some players of "Forge of Freedom" have been volunteering to write biographies of each general that is included in the game, adding an educational dimension to the game. The game also features economics, European diplomacy, trade, and politics (in the form of state governors), which are all important for success.

Scenarios
There are no scenarios starting after 1861. The simplistic nature of the economic system provided with the game does not easily map to real life events and statistics.

Notes

References
Western Civilization Software
Matrixgames forum

Reviews
Gamesquad.com
ArmchairGeneral.com
BovineConspiracy.com

Interview with Developers
Armchair General interview
Ann Arbor News
GamersInfo.net

American Civil War video games
Strategy video games
2006 video games
Indie video games
North America-exclusive video games
Turn-based strategy video games
Video games developed in the United States
Video games set in the United States
Windows games
Windows-only games
Computer wargames
Matrix Games games
Multiplayer and single-player video games